The Blue Grass Stakes, currently the Toyota Blue Grass Stakes due to sponsorship by the Toyota Motor Corporation, is a horse race for 3-year-old Thoroughbreds held annually in April at Keeneland Racecourse in Lexington, Kentucky. The race is run at  miles on the dirt and currently offers a purse of $1,000,000. The Blue Grass Stakes was a Grade I event from 1974 (when grading was first introduced) through 1989 and again from 1999 to 2016. It was a Grade II event from 2017-2021, and returned to a Grade I in 2022.

It was named for the Bluegrass region of Kentucky, characterized by grass having bluish-green culms, which is known as the "heart" of the thoroughbred racing industry.

First run at the Kentucky Association track in Lexington in 1911, the Blue Grass has, from its inception, served as an important prep for the Kentucky Derby. At the Lexington Association track, the Blue Grass was staged from 1911 through 1914 and from 1919 through 1926. The race was revived at Keeneland in the spring of 1937. In 1943–1944, the Blue Grass was renewed as a part of the Keeneland-at-Churchill Downs meeting. In 1945, the Blue Grass was run as part of the Churchill Downs meeting. Today it is part of the Keeneland program.

From 2007 to 2014, the race was held on a synthetic "all-weather" surface. Otherwise, it has been run on a dirt surface.

Records (Keeneland)
Fastest Time: (at Current Distance of  miles)
 1:47.20 – Skip Away (1996)

Most wins by an owner
 6 – Calumet Farm (1938, 1943, 1947, 1948, 1968, 1978)

Most wins by a jockey
 6 – Bill Shoemaker (1959, 1960, 1965, 1966, 1969, 1982)

Most wins by a trainer: 
 3 – Ben A. Jones (1943, 1947, 1948)
 3 – Woody Stephens (1949, 1954, 1974)
 3 – LeRoy Jolley (1962, 1976, 1977), 
 3 – Nick Zito (1991, 1998, 2004)
 3 – Todd A. Pletcher (2005, 2008, 2015)

Winners

* 1951 – The race was made up of two heats. Sonic won the second heat but was disqualified and placed fourth.

Winners of the Lexington Association Blue Grass Stakes

See also
Blue Grass Stakes "top three finishers" and starters
Road to the Kentucky Derby

References

External links
 Toyota Blue Grass Stakes official website
 Keeneland official website
  NTRA entry on Toyota Blue Grass Stakes

Keeneland horse races
Flat horse races for three-year-olds
Triple Crown Prep Races
Grade 2 stakes races in the United States
Graded stakes races in the United States
Recurring sporting events established in 1911
1911 establishments in Kentucky